The Independent Restaurant Coalition is a US trade group formed during the COVID-19 pandemic by independent restaurateurs and chefs. During the pandemic the group lobbied local, state and federal governments for relief after their businesses were closed by government mandates to slow the spread of the virus. Their aim was to mitigate the impact of the closings on independent restaurants. Multiple prominent chefs and restaurateurs formed the leadership team.

Background 
According to the IRC, independent restaurants represented 4% of the US GDP and employed 11 million workers at the beginning of 2020. The US has 500,000 independently-operated restaurants.

History 
The coalition got its start during the pandemic after state and local governments started shutting down restaurants and bars to slow the spread of the virus. On March 18, 2020 eighteen restaurant owners gathered for a phone call organized by Andrew Chason of Creative Arts Agency to discuss the impact of the COVID 19 pandemic and the lack of representation in Washington, DC.  Within 12 hours of this call a Coalition was formed and lobbyists were engaged. The Founding Members of the Coalition are Adam Saper, Michael Shemtov,Caroline Styne, Sam Kass, Kevin Boehm, Donnie Madia, Erika Polmar, Naomi Pomeroy, Andrew Carmellini, Andrew Zimmern, Ashley Christenson, Will Guidara, Steven Satterfield, Bobby Stuckey, Kwame Onwuachi, Tom Colicchio, and José Andrés.

Mission 
The initial goal was to secure financial and legislative protections for restaurants and their workers. After the federal government passed the CARES Act the group said the bill's primary provision, the Paycheck Protection Program, did not help independent restaurateurs. At the end of April the group called for a $120 billion fund for small and independent restaurateurs, asking congress to exclude publicly-traded restaurants and large restaurant chains from accessing the fund.

References

2020 establishments in the United States
American food and drink organizations
Business organizations
Food industry trade groups
Lobbying organizations in the United States
Organizations based in the United States
Organizations established in 2020